William Rohr (May 21, 1918 – July 16, 1986) was an American college basketball coach and athletics administrator. He was served as the head basketball coach at Miami University from 1951 to 1957 and Northwestern University from 1957 to 1963. He coached his teams to a 157–117 record, winning four Mid-American Conference (MAC) championships at Miami and three NCAA tournament appearances.  He also served as Ohio University's athletic director from 1963 to 1978.  An alumnus of Ohio Wesleyan University, he was a member of Phi Gamma Delta fraternity.

Head coaching record

References

1918 births
1986 deaths
American men's basketball coaches
American men's basketball players
Basketball coaches from Ohio
Basketball players from Ohio
Miami RedHawks men's basketball coaches
Northwestern Wildcats men's basketball coaches
Ohio Bobcats athletic directors
Ohio Wesleyan Battling Bishops men's basketball players